Major Anuj Sood, SC, ADC (17 Dec 1989 – 2 May 2020) was an Indian Army Officer who received the Shaurya Chakra posthumously. He was a member of the 19th Battalion, Brigade of Guards and 21st Rashtriya Rifles Battalion. He was martyred in action while serving with the latter in Handwara, Jammu and Kashmir.

Early life and education 
Sood was born in the Kangra district of Himachal Pradesh. Later relocated to Chandigarh. He was born on December 17, 1989, in Air Force Command Hospital Bengaluru, to Brigadier Chandrakant Sood (retd.) and Smt Ragini Sood. He did his schooling from Army Public School, Udhampur, T-Morh, Jammuy and Kashmir, and after that from Punjab Public School, Nabha. In 2008, having cleared AIEEE, he met all eligibility criteria for joining the Indian Institute of Technology (IIT), but chose the National Defence Academy instead. From his childhood, he aspired to follow in the footsteps of his father, who served in the Indian Army Corps of Electronics and Mechanical Engineers.

Military career 
Sood was commissioned from the Indian Military Academy, Dehradun on 9 June 2012. After completing his training as a young Lieutenant, he handled regimental duties such as Adjutant and Platoon Commander, before being appointed as Aide-de-camp to General Officer Commanding 14 RAPID for a period of 13 months. He then went on to complete the Junior Command Courses at Army War College, Mhow, where he excelled. Sood later married Akriti Sood. Akriti Sood is a software engineer and daughter of a Navy Marine Commando. On March 4, 2018, Sood was assigned to the 21 Rashtriya Rifles (Guards).

Shaurya Chakra

Citation 
Sood was awarded the nation's third highest peacetime gallantry award ‘Shaurya Chakra' on 26 January 2021 for his supreme sacrifice during Operation Chanjimula. Major Anuj Sood's Shaurya Chakra Citation is as follows:

References

External links 
 https://www.gallantryawards.gov.in/awardee/4957
 major anuj sood biography

1989 births
2020 deaths
Recipients of the Shaurya Chakra
Indian Army officers
People from Kangra, Himachal Pradesh
Indian military personnel killed in action
Army War College, Mhow alumni